The Canadian National Baptist Convention (formerly Canadian Convention of Southern Baptists)  is a Baptist Christian denomination in Canada. It is affiliated with the Baptist World Alliance and the Evangelical Fellowship of Canada. The headquarters is in Cochrane, Alberta.

History
Since 1951, contact with the Southern Baptists, increased the interest of Canadian churches in the Southern Baptist educational and evangelistic programs. In the fall of 1952, Northwest began using the Teacher Training Course of the SBC. Early in 1953, a pastor's conference recommended the Sunday School program of the Southern Baptist Sunday School Board.

Regular Baptists in British Columbia were divided over the "Southern Baptist issue". In October 1953, the Emmanuel Baptist Church of Vancouver, British Columbia joined the Baptist General Convention of Oregon-Washington, an affiliate of the Southern Baptist Convention, while also maintaining membership in the Regular Baptist Convention of British Columbia. The Oregon-Washington Convention determined it would assist affiliated churches, but would not initiate any new work in Canada. At the British Columbia Regular Baptist Convention in 1955, several resolutions were directed against the Emmanuel Church (now called Kingcrest Southern Baptist Church) and the Southern Baptists. This caused Kingcrest and four other churches to withdraw from the B. C. Convention and affiliate with only the Southern Baptists in the northwest. Though these Canadian churches were members of the Oregon-Washington Convention, they were unable to affiliate directly with the SBC, because of questions relating to the wording of the SBC Constitution.

The Canadian Southern Baptist Conference is formed in 1957. In 1985 the Canadian Southern Baptist Conference adopted a new constitution and became the Canadian Convention of Southern Baptists. In 1987, it opened the Canadian Baptist Theological Seminary and College, in Cochrane, Alberta.

In 2001, the attendance was 10,189 members.  In July 2008, the convention voted to change its name to the Canadian National Baptist Convention (In French: Convention Nationale Baptiste Canadienne). According to a denomination census released in 2020, it claimed 404 churches and 23,130 members.

According to a denomination census released in 2020, it included 429 churches and 17,116 members.

Ministries
Its official publication, Baptist Horizon is published 4 times per year and is also available online at the CNBC web site. The Convention engages in specific men's, women's, youth and university ministries. The CNBC maintains a Foundation for receiving financial contributions, labors in Canadian church planting, and partners in global missions with the International Mission Board of the SBC. The National Leadership Board, elected by Convention messengers, is the highest operating board within the organization.

Beliefs 
The denomination has a Baptist confession of faith. It is affiliated with the Baptist World Alliance.

See also
Baptists in Canada

References

Sources
Baptists Around the World, by Albert W. Wardin, Jr.
Encyclopedia of Southern Baptists, Vol. III, Davis C. Woolley, editor
Canadian National Baptist Convention

External links
Canadian National Baptist Convention - official Web Site
Canadian Baptist Theological Seminary and College - official Web Site

1963 establishments in Canada
Christian organizations established in 1963
Baptist denominations in North America
Baptist denominations established in the 20th century
Baptist Christianity in Canada